Nur Ali (also Romanized as Nūr ‘Alī and Noor Ali) is a village in Shahid Modarres Rural District, in the Central District of Shushtar County, Khuzestan Province, Iran. At the 2006 census, its population was 95, in 21 families.

References 

Populated places in Shushtar County